Dominick Minicucci Jr. (born January 10, 1969) is an American gymnast. He competed at the 1988 Summer Olympics and the 1992 Summer Olympics.

References

1969 births
Living people
American male artistic gymnasts
Olympic gymnasts of the United States
Gymnasts at the 1988 Summer Olympics
Gymnasts at the 1992 Summer Olympics
Sportspeople from Staten Island
Pan American Games medalists in gymnastics
Pan American Games gold medalists for the United States
Pan American Games silver medalists for the United States
Pan American Games bronze medalists for the United States
Gymnasts at the 1991 Pan American Games